George Macon Shuffer (September 27, 1923 – February 5, 2005) was a United States Army brigadier general.

Early life
Shuffer was born and grew up in Palestine, Texas to a family of tenant farmers. Shuffer was awarded academic scholarships to LeMoyne College and Lincoln University in Pennsylvania, but enlisted in the United States Army after graduating from high school to support his family, joining his two older brothers.

Military career
Shuffer arrived at Fort Huachuca, where his brothers were stationed as members of the 25th Infantry Regiment, in June 1940. The quota for the regiment was full and he did not formally enlist until August. He was transferred to Camp Wolters in Texas and reached the rank of Sergeant before entering Officer Candidate School. Upon commissioning, Shuffer was assigned to the 368th Infantry Regiment and deployed to the Pacific in 1944.

Shuffer remained in the Army after the war. He served in the Korean War, commanding Company F of the 24th Infantry Regiment. Shuffer was seriously wounded in April 1951 and was evacuated to Walter Reed Army Medical Center.

Shuffer commanded 2nd Battalion, 2nd Infantry Regiment and deployed to Vietnam in October 1965. He commanded the unit during the Battle of Ap Bau Bang. Shuffer was deployed to Vietnam a second time as part of the staff for II Field Force, Vietnam. He was assigned to command the 193rd Infantry Brigade in the Panama Canal Zone in 1970.

In 1972, Shuffer was promoted to the rank of Brigadier General. Shuffer medically retired from the Army on June 30, 1975, and was awarded the Distinguished Service Medal on November 5, 1975.

References

1923 births
2005 deaths
United States Army generals
United States Army personnel of the Korean War
United States Army personnel of the Vietnam War
United States Army personnel of World War II
African-American United States Army personnel
People from Palestine, Texas
African Americans in World War II
African Americans in the Korean War
African Americans in the Vietnam War